Richard Freeman (born 1970) is a cryptozoologist, author, zoological journalist, and WebTV Presenter. He is also the zoological director of the Centre for Fortean Zoology (CFZ), and co-edits both the journal, Animals & Men and several editions of the annual CFZ Yearbook. Freeman has written, co-written, or edited a number of books, and has contributed widely to both Fortean and zoological magazines, as well as other newspapers and periodicals, including Fortean Times and Paranormal Magazine.

He has also lectured across the UK at events such as the Fortean Times Unconvention, the Weird Weekend, Microcon and at museums and universities such as the Natural History Museum, the Grant Museum of Zoology, Queen Mary, University of London and the Last Tuesday Society.

Richard claims an early obsession with the classic science fiction series Doctor Who (with Jon Pertwee) had sparked an interest in all things weird. He studied zoology at Leeds University. After school, he became a zoo keeper at Twycross Zoo in Leicestershire and became head keeper of reptiles,  working with more than 400 exotic species from ants to elephants (but with a special interest in crocodilians). After leaving the zoo, he worked in an exotic pet shop, a reptile rescue centre, and as a gravedigger.

Whilst on holiday he learned of the CFZ and bought a copy of the Centre's journal, Animals & Men, which left him impressed enough to subscribe and begin contributing. He eventually became the CFZ's Yorkshire representative, then moved to Devon to become a full-time member of the Centre. He is now the zoological director and co-editor of Animals & Men.

Cryptozoological expeditions

 Thailand in 2000 for a species of a giant crested snake known as the naga.
 Sumatra, Indonesia in 2003 and 2004 for an upright walking non-human ape called orang-pendek.
 Mongolia in 2005 for the Mongolian death worm.
 The Gambia in 2006 for a dragon-like aquatic cryptid, the Ninki Nanka.
 Guyana in 2007 for the giant anaconda, the di-di (a yeti-like hominid), the water tiger (a spotted semi-aquatic, flesh eating mammal), and the bushmen, an unrecorded race of three-foot pygmies with red faces. He also heard of what may be a new species of tiny caiman with a red strip running along its back.
 Kabardino-Balkaria, Russia in 2008 for the almasty, a relic hominid.
 Sumatra again in 2009 for the orang-pendek.
 India in 2010 for the Mande-Barung or Indian yeti.
 Sumatra again in 2011 and 2013 for the orang-pendek.
 Tasmania in 2013, 2016, and 2017 for the thylacine or Tasmanian Wolf
 Tajikistan in 2018 for the gul, a creature akin to the Russian almasty.
 Sumatra in 2022 for the orang-pendek.

Creatures hunted
 The Monster of Martin Mere, an 8-foot, swan-eating catfish in Lancashire.
 The Loch Ness Monster
 The Monster of Loch Morar
 The Monster of Windermere

Books
Weird Devon (Bossiney, Padstow, 1999) with Jonathan Downes and Graham Inglis
Dragons: More Than a Myth? (CFZ Press, Bideford, 2005)
Explore Dragons (Heart of Albion Press, Loughborough, 2006)
The Great Yokai Encyclopedia; an A to Z of Japanese Monsters (CFZ Press, Bideford, 2010)
 Orang-pendek: Sumatra's Forgotten Ape (CFZ Press, Bideford, 2011) 
 Green Unpleasant Land ; 18 stories of British Horror (CFZ Press, Bideford, 2012) 
 Hyakumonogatari: Tales of Japanese Horror (CFZ Press, Bideford, 2012)
 Adventures in Cryptozology: Hunting for Yetis Mongolian Deathworms and Other Not-So-Mythical Monsters (Mango Publishing, Florida 2019 )
 In Search of Real Monsters:Adventures in Cryptozology Volume Two (Mango Publishing, Florida 2022 )

Appearances in media
Penn & Teller: Bullshit! - Season 4 Episode 1: Cryptozoology

References

Cryptozoologists
Fortean writers
British zoologists
1970 births
Living people
People from Nuneaton
Alumni of the University of Leeds